The Market Museum (1804-1822) of Boston, Massachusetts, was located in Market Square, adjacent to Faneuil Hall. Phillip Woods directed the enterprise. Also called the Boston Museum, it featured displays of "wax figures, pictures, natural and fanciful curiosities -- such as have not been exhibited in this town before" and was "opened for the inspection of the public every day, from 9 o'clock in the morning until 9 in the evening."

Among the highlights advertised: "the Magical Deotric, which represents a variety of elegant views of the most populous cities on the globe;" "Nairne's new patent electrical machine;" "performance of the phantasmagoria, or German ghosts;" "the great elephant Horatio;" "grand cosmorama of Montreal & its environs;" "live alligator;" "a young whale, just brought in from sea;" "live bear;"  80-foot-long "skin of the sea-elephant;" pictorial "likenesses of generals Washington and Green;" "wax figures."

On the premises Woods sometimes sold goods such as "cement" and "electrical machines." He also treated medical problems: "Mr. Woods tenders his services to those ladies or gentlemen who stand in need of medical electricity, and would inform them that he cures the gout, rheumatic complaints, dystentary, toothache, ague, asthma, felon or whitlow, lock-jaw, pally, quincy, ricketts, St. Vitus' Dance, and a variety of other complaints incident to the human body." The museum closed by 1822, when the newly formed New-England Museum acquired its collection.

Notes

References

Further reading

 

1804 establishments in Massachusetts
1822 disestablishments in Massachusetts
Defunct museums in Boston
Former buildings and structures in Boston
Cultural history of Boston
Financial District, Boston
19th century in Boston
1800s in the United States
1810s in the United States